Tachosa guichardi is a moth of the family Erebidae. It is found in Ethiopia, Kenya, Nigeria, Saudi Arabia, Tanzania and Yemen.

References

Moths described in 1982
Tachosa
Moths of Africa
Moths of Asia